Eirini Kavarnou (born July 5, 1980) is a Greek swimmer.  She competed in the 100 meter Butterfly at both the 2004 and 2008 Olympics

References

1980 births
Living people
Greek female swimmers
Greek female butterfly swimmers
Olympic swimmers of Greece
Swimmers at the 2004 Summer Olympics
Swimmers at the 2008 Summer Olympics
Mediterranean Games bronze medalists for Greece
Mediterranean Games medalists in swimming
Swimmers at the 2001 Mediterranean Games